Fix & Foxi and Friends is an animated adaption of Rolf Kauka's comic series Fix and Foxi. In February 2000, Fix & Foxi first aired in Germany. 52 episodes were produced. Each episode consists of four segments, three of which stars the title characters and one or more of their friends and the last segment stars a family of anthropomorphic dogs called the Peppercorn Family. In addition small snippets starring Makiki appear in between segments.

Characters

Fix and Foxi - Twin fox brothers, who get busy and have fun throughout their time. Fix wears yellow overalls and has a tuft on his head while Foxi wears blue overalls.
Lupo - A wolf and one of the twins' friends. He lives in a tower. Usually he is lazy, self-centered and has a love for Eusebia's cakes.
Professor Knox - A raven and an absent-minded scientist. Half of his inventions go wrong, but his work greatly interests the twins.
Uncle Fax - The twins' uncle, whom they live with. Quite tolerant to the twins' antics but full of opportunities to keep them content.
Olma Eusebia - An elderly wolf who enjoys the twins' and her granddaughter's company. She is very good at making cakes and preventing Lupo from getting them.
Lupini - Eusebia's granddaughter a good friend of the twins but sometimes is good at outsmarting them.
Stinky and Limpy - Recurring canine thieves or smugglers who commit crime only to be thwarted each time by the twins. Stinky is by namesake smelly which bothers his partner Limpy.
Papa - The father of the family. Very reckless and making hasty decisions and very miserly, he is not good at making a good impression with his family and often the first to pick a fight with Snotty.
Mama - The mother of the family. Has good common sense and often Papa's voice of reason and does more than her fair share of work in the house.
Pip and Pep - Twins and the younger children of the family. They are quite mischievous and look for opportunities to pull pranks for their own means.
Lucky - The adolescent of the family. He tries to be independent but always gets involved with family matters, but he sometimes enjoys the company of his younger siblings.
Makiki - The family pet. A yellow mouse-like creature with monkey-like behaviour.
Snotty - A frog. The Peppercorns' unfriendly neighbour and the town mayor who lives just opposite their house and accuses visitors of being 'Trespassers'. As his name implies he is snobbish, rude and he doesn't like the Peppercorns, but very occasionally he works with them to solve his bigger problems.
Lizard - A lizard who has various occupations in his work line. He solves various odd jobs for the Peppercorns when hired.

Voice cast

Episodes

External links

2000 German television series debuts
2002 German television series endings
2000s animated television series
Australian Broadcasting Corporation original programming
German children's animated adventure television series
German children's animated comedy television series
Animated series based on comics
Television shows based on comics
BBC children's television shows
German-language television shows
Spanish children's animated adventure television series
Spanish children's animated comedy television series
Australian children's animated adventure television series
Australian children's animated comedy television series
RTVE shows
Animated television series about brothers
Animated television series about foxes